Candala Airport  is an airstrip serving Candala (also spelled Qandala), a town in the northeastern Bari region in Puntland, Somalia.

Facilities
The airstrip is open to the public. It has 1 natural surface runway measuring 3,579 ft (1,091 m).

References

External links

Satellite image of Candala airstrip

Airports in Somalia
Puntland
Bari, Somalia